Cuneus is part of the brain.

Cuneus (Latin for "wedge"; plural, cunei) may also refer to:

an architectural term; see Glossary_of_architecture#C
 Cuneus (entomology), a wedge-shaped section of the forewing of certain heteropteran bugs
 Cuneus (foram), a genus of uni-cellular creatures
 Cuneus (Lusitania), a region of the Roman Province of Lusitania